Rosalba Géraldine Bazán Ortíz is a Mexican actress.

Early life
Bazán was born in Mexico City, Mexico, to Rosalba Ortiz Cabrera. Her father, Manuel Antonio Bazán, is an entrepreneur living in southern California. Her brother is Angel Claude, who is also an actor.

Career
Bazán began her career in 1988 first appearing in TV commercials, before landing on roles as a child actor in telenovelas. She appeared in Corazón Salvaje, Buscando el Paraíso, María la del Barrio, Preciosa, Traviesa and Camila for Televisa. And later had main roles in the TV Azteca-produced telenovelas Catalina Y Sebastián, Ellas Inocentes o Culpables, Como en el Cine and Dos Chicos de Cuidado.

Towards the end of 2004 she traveled to Miami to film the telenovela Soñar no Cuesta Nada, produced by Venevisión-Univision.  In 2005, she was in eight films in Mexico and nine theater plays, including Univision's El Amor No Tiene Precio.  The actress starred in Tierra de Pasiones in 2006 from NBC Telemundo. Bazán played an antagonic role in the 2007 teen telenovela Bajo las Riendas del Amor from Televisa Miami Studios. All three telenovelas were broadcast in the United States, Mexico, Latin America and Europe.

In 2008, Bazán appeared in Victoria, a telenovela filmed in Bogotá, Colombia, alongside Victoria Ruffo, Arturo Peniche and Mauricio Ochmann. Victoria is a remake of Mirada de Mujer, itself a remake of Colombian telenovela Señora Isabel. She worked again with Venevision - Univision in 2010 with Sacrificio de Mujer.

Filmography

Film

Television

Awards
Gold Aztec Award Premio Azteca de Oro en Los Angeles Cal. Hispanic Heritage
ACE Award, Premio ACE New York for the face of the year
Sin Limite Award, Premios Sin Limite New York for best female performance
Latino Award, Premios Latinos New York as well as female performance
Diamond Mara Award, Mara de Oro awards in Venezuela for best TV actress
Palmas de Oro Latinas Award Palmas de Oro Phoenix, AZ, USA
Premio Amigos del Peru Miami, FL, USA
Premio Carteles Miami, FL, USA

Organizations and projects 
Bazán is a member of the First Parliament of Immigrants, the Mex-I-can Foundation and assisted the National Hispanic Conclave in Florida. She worked with La Raza National Convention (NCLR).

Bazán is a founding member of "Women on Film and Television in Mexico", which promotes the work of Mexican and foreign entertainers through its "Muestra Internacional" initiative. Bazán also collaborates with charity organizations that promote the film industry both in Mexico and the United States, such as the "Fundacion Expression en corto y Canana y Documental Ambulante, AC", an entity that promotes film and video as a tool of social conscience.

Géraldine Bazán has been Goodwill Ambassador and International Marshall of the Hispanic and Puerto Rican National Day Parade parades held in Manhattan. In 2008 she was the International Queen of the Mexican Day Parade in New York and Desfile Mexicano de Independencia East LA. She was an honor guest along in the 5 May festival in Flushing M Park in Queens, and Manhattan N.Y., as well as serving as the Godmother of the First Dominican Parade in Miami, Florida.

Personal life
Bazán was married to actor Gabriel Soto from 2016 to 2018, with whom had two daughters.

References

External links

1983 births
Living people
Mexican emigrants to the United States
Actresses from Mexico City
20th-century Mexican actresses
21st-century Mexican actresses
Mexican people of Croatian descent
Mexican expatriate actors in the United States